Carl David Voltmer (October 24, 1902 – March 5, 1995) was an American football player and coach. He served as the head football coach at Defiance College in Defiance, Ohio in 1932 and Central Missouri State College—now known as University of Central Missouri—from 1935 to 1943, compiling a career college football coaching record of 37–36–10. As a college athlete, Voltmer played football and wrestled at the University of Iowa.

Head coaching record

College

References

1902 births
1995 deaths
Central Missouri Mules football coaches
Defiance Yellow Jackets football coaches
Iowa Hawkeyes football players
Iowa Hawkeyes wrestlers
High school football coaches in Illinois
People from Sigourney, Iowa
Players of American football from Iowa